Alice (or Alix) de Vergy (1182–1251) was Duchess of Burgundy as the second spouse of Odo III, Duke of Burgundy. She was the regent of Burgundy during the minority of her son 1218–28.

Biography
Alice was the daughter of Hugh, Lord of Vergy, and Gillette de Trainel. Her marriage was arranged in 1196 as a part of the peace between her father and Odo, who had been engaged in a long lasting conflict, and took place in 1199. As a dowry, she was granted several of her father's land, while Odo granted her father undisputed ownership of his land. At the death of Odo III in 1218, he was succeeded by his son with Alice, Hugh IV. As Hugh IV was five years old, Alice became the regent of Burgundy during his minority with the title "Ducissa mater ducis Bourgogne".

As regent, Alice worked to secure the inheritance of her son, and received the vassals oath of loyalty in the place of her son. In 1225, she managed to prevent a conflict with Dauphine. She acquired Beaune and Chalon through purchase. In 1227, she signed an alliance with Champagne against Nevers.

In 1228, her son was declared of legal majority, and Alice resigned her regency and left court and retired to her dower lands. In 1231, however, it is noted that she acted as the representative of her son in successfully solving the conflict between the Vicomte de Dijon and the abbey of Citeaux. She spent her long retirement as an appreciated benefactor of religious communities.

Family
In 1199, she married Odo III, Duke of Burgundy. Their children were:
 Joan (1200–1223), married Raoul II of Lusignan (died 1250), Seigneur d'Issoudun and Count of Eu.
 Alice (1204–1266), married Robert I (died 1262), Count of Clermont and Dauphin of Auvergne
 Hugh IV (1213–1272), successor to the Duchy
Beatrice (born 1216), married Humbert III of Thoire (died 1279)

References

Sources

External links
Valentina Karlíková: The Duchess of Burgundy and Regent Alix of Vergy in the Light of Her Documents and Correspondence. Prague Papers on the History of International Relations, 2018, 2.

1252 deaths
1182 births
12th-century French people
12th-century French women
13th-century French people
13th-century women rulers
Duchesses of Burgundy
House of Burgundy
13th-century French women